The Saint: Music From The Motion Picture Soundtrack is the soundtrack to the 1997 movie The Saint.

The soundtrack features prominent musical artists from the late 1990s, including Duran Duran, Sneaker Pimps, Orbital, Moby, Fluke, Luscious Jackson, The Chemical Brothers, Underworld, Daft Punk, David Bowie, Superior, Dreadzone, Duncan Sheik, and Everything but the Girl. The album also includes an updated version of the theme music from the 1960s television series.

“You're All I've Got Tonight,” written by Ric Ocasek and performed by The Smashing Pumpkins, is part of the movie, but not included on the soundtrack album.

Track listing

References

1997 soundtrack albums
Thriller film soundtracks
Electronica soundtracks
Virgin Records soundtracks